Phyllium philippinicum is a species of leaf insect in the family Phylliidae. It is endemic to the Philippines.

Taxonomy 
Phyllium philippinicum was described on the basis of a female holotype from Ilanin Forest in the Bataan Province. The holotype is currently stored in the Bavarian State Collection of Zoology.

It is in the subgenus Phyllium.

Distribution 
It is found on Luzon.

References 

Insects described in 2009
Insects of the Philippines
Phylliidae